Luigi Carnera (born in Trieste April 14, 1875, died in Florence, July 30, 1962) was an Italian astronomer and mathematician. He discovered 16 minor planets in the early 20th century. The main-belt asteroid 39653 Carnera was named in his honour.

In his early career he worked as Max Wolf's assistant at Heidelberg, Germany he discovered a number of asteroids. He worked in Germany, Italy and Argentina before returning to Italy for good in 1908.

He was director of Trieste Observatory starting in 1919; Trieste had just been annexed to Italy following World War I. He then became director of Capodimonte Observatory in Naples starting in 1932 and until his retirement in 1950. In 1943 during World War II, the observatory was temporarily occupied by American and British troops in order to install a radar station.

References

External links 

1875 births
1962 deaths
Discoverers of asteroids

20th-century Italian astronomers
Austro-Hungarian astronomers
Austro-Hungarian expatriates in Germany